

141001–141100 

|-bgcolor=#f2f2f2
| colspan=4 align=center | 
|}

141101–141200 

|-id=128
| 141128 Ghyoot ||  || Herman Ghyoot (born 1941), founder and first president of the Public Observatory Beisbroek (Volkssterrenwacht vzw Beisbroek; Observatoire de Beisbroek) in Bruges, Belgium (also see ). || 
|}

141201–141300 

|-bgcolor=#f2f2f2
| colspan=4 align=center | 
|}

141301–141400 

|-bgcolor=#f2f2f2
| colspan=4 align=center | 
|}

141401–141500 

|-id=414
| 141414 Bochanski ||  || John Bochanski (born 1980), an American astronomer with the Sloan Digital Sky Survey, is known for his research on the luminosity function of low-mass stars and the structure of the Milky Way. || 
|-id=496
| 141496 Bartkevicius ||  || Antanas Bartkevičius (born 1940), Lithuanian astronomer and professor in astronomy at the Vilnius Pedagogical University || 
|}

141501–141600 

|-bgcolor=#f2f2f2
| colspan=4 align=center | 
|}

141601–141700 

|-bgcolor=#f2f2f2
| colspan=4 align=center | 
|}

141701–141800 

|-bgcolor=#f2f2f2
| colspan=4 align=center | 
|}

141801–141900 

|-bgcolor=#f2f2f2
| colspan=4 align=center | 
|}

141901–142000 

|-id=995
| 141995 Rossbeyer ||  || Ross A. Beyer (born 1975) is an American research scientist at Ames Research Center, who was a member of the geology science team for the New Horizons mission to Pluto. || 
|}

References 

141001-142000